Heterophile antigens are antigens of similar nature, if not identical, that are present in different tissues in different biological species, classes, or kingdoms. Usually different species have different antigen sets, but the hetereophile antigen is shared by different species. Other heterophile antigens are responsible for some diagnostic serological tests such as:
Weil-Felix reaction for typhus fever
Paul Bunnell test for infectious mononucleosis
Cold agglutinin test in primary atypical pneumonia

Chemically, heterophile antigens are composed of lipoprotein-polysaccharide complexes. There is a possibility of there being identical chemical groupings in the structure of mucopolysaccharids and lipids.
Example: Forssman antigen, cross reacting microbial antigen
so antibodies to these antigens produced by one species cross react with antigens of other species. It is widely present  in some plants bacteria animal and birds. However  it is not present  in rabbit.  Therefore antibodies are produced in rabbit serum by injecting the antigen (antiforssman antibodies).

References

Antibodies
Immunology
Antigens